Chintamani Assembly constituency is one of the 224 constituencies in the Karnataka Legislative Assembly of Karnataka a south state of India. It is also part of Kolar Lok Sabha constituency.

Members of Legislative Assembly

Mysore State
 1951 (Seat-1): M. C. Anjaneya Reddy, Indian National Congress
 1951 (Seat-2): Narayanappa, Indian National Congress

 1957: T. K. Gangi Reddy, Independent

 1962: M. C. Anjaneya Reddy, Independent

 1967: T. K. Gangi Reddy, Independent

 1972: Chowda Reddy, Indian National Congress

Karnataka State
 1978: Chowda Reddy, Indian National Congress (Indira)

 1983: Chowda Reddy, Indian National Congress

 1985: K. M. Krishna Reddy, Janata Party

 1989: Chowda Reddy, Indian National Congress

 1994: K. M. Krishna Reddy, Janata Dal

 1999: Chowda Reddy, Independent

 2004: M. C. Sudhakar, Indian National Congress

 2008: M. C. Sudhakar, Indian National Congress

 2013: J. K. Krishna Reddy, Janata Dal (Secular)

See also
 Chikballapur district
 List of constituencies of Karnataka Legislative Assembly

References

Assembly constituencies of Karnataka
Chikkaballapur district